Ozarba aeria, the aerial brown moth, is an owlet moth (family Noctuidae). The species was first described by Augustus Radcliffe Grote in 1881. It is found in Central and North America.

The MONA or Hodges number for Ozarba aeria is 9030.

References

Further reading

External links
 

Eustrotiinae
Articles created by Qbugbot
Moths described in 1881